The Pamilo Hydroelectric Power Plant is a power station in Eno, Finland that supplies electricity to Finland.  It was opened in 1955.

It is notable for being Vattenfall's largest hydroelectric power plant in Finland, with an installed generating capacity of 84 megawatts across three units and produces 256 gigawatt hours per year.

Water is held back in two basins, by two dams; the Pamilo dam and  dam

See also

 Energy in Finland

References

External links
 

Hydroelectric power stations in Finland